Nucleotide-binding oligomerization domain-containing protein 2 (NOD2), also known as caspase recruitment domain-containing protein 15 (CARD15) or inflammatory bowel disease protein 1 (IBD1), is a protein that in humans is encoded by the NOD2 gene located on chromosome 16. NOD2 plays an important role in the immune system. It recognizes bacterial molecules (peptidoglycans) and stimulates an immune reaction.

NOD2 is an intracellular pattern recognition receptor, which is similar in structure to resistant proteins of plants and recognizes molecules containing the specific structure called muramyl dipeptide (MDP) that is found in certain bacteria.

Structure 

The C-terminal portion of the protein contains a leucine-rich repeat domain that is known to play a role in protein–protein interactions. The middle part of the protein is characterized by a NOD domain involved in protein self-oligomerization. The N-terminal portion contains two CARD domains known to play a role in apoptosis and NF-κB activation pathways.

Function 

This gene is a member of the NOD1/Apaf-1 family (also known as NOD-like receptor family) and encodes a protein with two caspase recruitment domains (CARDs) and eleven leucine-rich repeats (LRRs). The protein is primarily expressed in the peripheral blood leukocytes. It plays a role in the immune response by recognizing the bacterial molecules which possess the muramyl dipeptide (MDP) moiety and activating the NF-κB protein.

Clinical significance 

Mutations in this gene have been associated with Crohn's disease, Blau syndrome, severe pulmonary sarcoidosis and Graft-versus-host disease.

The NOD2 gene is linked to inflammatory diseases such as Inflammatory bowel disease/Crohn's disease and Blau syndrome.

Interactions 

NOD2 has been shown to interact with NLRC4.

NOD2 has also been shown to bind to MAVS in response to ssRNA or viral RNA treatment and activate the IFN response. This is the first report of NOD2 acting as a pattern-recognition receptor for viruses.

See also 
 Mifamurtide, a NOD2 activator for the treatment of osteosarcoma

References

Further reading 

 
 
 
 
 
 
 
 
 
 
 
 
 
 
 
 

LRR proteins
NOD-like receptors